Ahmed Mukhtar Arabic, أحمد مختار (born 1967) is an Iraqi musician who is internationally renowned for his playing of the oud. He was born in Baghdad and is a graduate of the Institute of Fine Arts in Baghdad.

Discography 

 The Road to Baghdad 2005 - New Maqams from Iraq
Rhythms Of Baghdad 2003 - Ahmed Mukhtar & Sattar al-Saadi
Words from Eden 1999 - Oud music from Iraq
Tajwal 1997 LIVE - Recital on Oud

External links 
 Ahmed Mukhtar's website

1967 births
Living people
Iraqi oud players
Musicians from Baghdad
Alumni of SOAS University of London
Academics of SOAS University of London